The SoNo Collection is an upscale shopping mall in the South Norwalk neighborhood of Norwalk, Connecticut. It was announced and originally developed by GGP Inc. (General Growth Properties) in 2017; it has been owned and managed by Brookfield Properties, a subsidiary of Brookfield Asset Management, since its acquisition of GGP in 2018.

The mall opened on October 11, 2019, and is the fourth mall in Fairfield County. The mall has adopted a phased opening process, including interactive art installations and community gathering spaces. It features southern Connecticut’s only Nordstrom and Connecticut's only Bloomingdale's as the anchor stores. It is located next to Interstate 95 and Route 7.

History
The SoNo Collection was a project announced in 2017 by mall developers General Growth Properties (GGP). GGP began construction on the mall in late 2017. A ground breaking ceremony was held on August 16, 2017. In August of 2018, Brookfield Property Partners acquired GGP, continuing the work on the mall. On October 18, 2018, work began on the Bloomingdale's anchor store.

See also

References

Brookfield Properties
Buildings and structures in Norwalk, Connecticut
Shopping malls in Connecticut
Tourist attractions in Fairfield County, Connecticut
Shopping malls established in 2019
Shopping malls in the New York metropolitan area
2019 establishments in Connecticut